James Moir Pirie  (March 31, 1853 – June 2, 1934) was a Major League Baseball shortstop for the 1883 Philadelphia Quakers.

External links

1853 births
1934 deaths
19th-century baseball players
Baseball people from Ontario
Canadian expatriate baseball players in the United States
London Tecumsehs (baseball) players
Major League Baseball shortstops
Major League Baseball players from Canada
Philadelphia Quakers players